The 2019 Allsvenskan, part of the 2019 Swedish football season, was the 95th season of Allsvenskan since its establishment in 1924. A total of 16 teams participated. AIK were the defending champions after winning the title in the previous season.

Djurgårdens IF won the Allsvenskan title, their first since 2005, their 8th overall and their 12th Swedish championship overall, in the 30th and final round on 2 November 2019 by playing a 2–2 tie in their away fixture against IFK Norrköping. This was also the second consecutive year that a team from Stockholm clinched the title.

Teams

A total of sixteen teams are contesting the league, including thirteen sides from the previous season, two promoted teams from the 2018 Superettan and one team from the 2018 Allsvenskan play-offs.

Dalkurd FF and Trelleborgs FF were relegated at the end of the 2018 season after finishing in the bottom two places of the table, and were replaced by the 2018 Superettan champions Helsingborgs IF and runners-up Falkenbergs FF. Helsingborg make their return to Allsvenskan after a two-year absence, this will be their 67th season in the top flight. Falkenberg will take part in Allsvenskan for the fourth time, returning to Allsvenskan after a two-year absence.

The play-off spot was taken by AFC Eskilstuna, replacing IF Brommapojkarna. The team made it back to Allsvenskan after just one season in the second division, having been relegated in 2017.

Stadia and locations

 1 According to each club information page at the Swedish Football Association website for Allsvenskan.

Managerial changes

League table

Positions by round

Results

Relegation play-offs
The 14th-placed team of Allsvenskan met the third-placed team from 2019 Superettan in a two-legged tie on a home-and-away basis with the team from Allsvenskan finishing at home.

Kalmar FF won 4–2 on aggregate.

Season statistics

Top scorers

Top assists

Hat-tricks

Monthly awards

Annual awards

See also

Competitions
 2019 Superettan
 2019 Division 1
 2018–19 Svenska Cupen
 2019–20 Svenska Cupen

Team seasons
 2019 AIK Fotboll season
 2019 BK Häcken season
 2019 Djurgårdens IF season
 2019 Hammarby Fotboll season
 2019 Malmö FF season

References

External links
 

2019
1
Sweden
Sweden